William John Blake (1805 – 15 September 1875) was a British Whig politician.

The first-born son of William Blake and Mary Nash, he was educated at Christ Church, Oxford, where he was a president of the United Debating Society, and at Lincoln's Inn.

Blake was elected a Whig Member of Parliament for Newport (Isle of Wight) at the 1837 general election but held the seat for just one term until 1841, when he stood but ended bottom of four candidates. He stood again for election at the 1847 general election, but he was unsuccessful, ending third of four candidates.

References

External links
 

UK MPs 1837–1841
Whig (British political party) MPs for English constituencies
1805 births
1875 deaths
Members of Parliament for the Isle of Wight
Presidents of the Oxford Union
Alumni of Christ Church, Oxford
Members of Lincoln's Inn